Calolydella is a genus of parasitoid flies in the family Tachinidae. This genus has been shown to primarily parasitize multiple species of caterpillars across a wide variety of families (Lepidoptera: Crambidae; Erebidae; Geometridae; Hesperiidae; Lycaenidae; Nymphalidae; Pieridae; Riodinidae; and Sphingidae).

Species
Calolydella adelinamoralesae Fleming & Wood, 2018
Calolydella alexanderjamesi Fleming & Wood, 2018
Calolydella andinensis (Townsend, 1927)
Calolydella argentea Fleming & Wood, 2018
Calolydella aureofacies Fleming & Wood, 2018
Calolydella bicolor Fleming & Wood, 2018
Calolydella bifissus Fleming & Wood, 2018
Calolydella blandita (Wulp, 1890)
Calolydella cingulata (Schiner, 1868)
Calolydella concinna (Wulp, 1890)
Calolydella crocata Fleming & Wood, 2018
Calolydella cylindriventris (Wulp, 1890)
Calolydella destituta Fleming & Wood, 2018
Calolydella discalis Fleming & Wood, 2018
Calolydella erasmocoronadoi Fleming & Wood, 2018
Calolydella felipechavarriai Fleming & Wood, 2018
Calolydella fredriksjobergi Fleming & Wood, 2018
Calolydella geminata Townsend, 1927
Calolydella gentica (Walker, 1860)
Calolydella inflatipalpis Fleming & Wood, 2018
Calolydella interrupta Fleming & Wood, 2018
Calolydella lathami (Curran, 1925)
Calolydella leucophaea (Wulp, 1890)
Calolydella nigripalpis Fleming & Wood, 2018
Calolydella omissa Fleming & Wood, 2018
Calolydella ordinalis Fleming & Wood, 2018
Calolydella peruviana (Townsend, 1927)
Calolydella renemalaisei Fleming & Wood, 2018
Calolydella rufiventris (Townsend, 1927)
Calolydella summatis Reinhard, 1975
Calolydella susanaroibasae Fleming & Wood, 2018
Calolydella tanyadapkeyae Fleming & Wood, 2018
Calolydella tenebrosa Fleming & Wood, 2018
Calolydella timjamesi Fleming & Wood, 2018
Calolydella triangulifera (Bigot, 1889)
Calolydella trifasciata (Walker, 1837)
Calolydella virginiajamesae Fleming & Wood, 2018

References

Diptera of North America
Diptera of South America
Exoristinae
Tachinidae genera
Taxa named by Charles Henry Tyler Townsend